Miele is a 2013 Italian drama film directed by Valeria Golino. It was screened in the Un Certain Regard section at the 2013 Cannes Film Festival where it won a commendation from the Ecumenical Jury. It was also nominated for the 2013 Lux Prize.

Cast
 Jasmine Trinca as Irene/Miele
 Carlo Cecchi as Carlo Grimaldi
 Libero De Rienzo as Rocco
 Vinicio Marchioni as Stefano
 Iaia Forte as Clelia
 Roberto De Francesco as Filippo
 Barbara Ronchi as Sandra
 Massimiliano Iacolucci as Irene's father
 Claudio Guain as Ennio
 Valeria Bilello as Irene's mother

Accolades

References

External links
 

2013 films
2013 drama films
Italian drama films
2010s Italian-language films
Films about euthanasia
2010s Italian films